Waverley Girls' High School is a public school for girls located in the suburb of Waverley in Johannesburg, South Africa.

History

Early history 
Plans for building the school started in 1952, and the school was completed in 1953. It finally opened in 1955.

Alumni

Paula Slier, television, radio and print journalist, news editor, and war correspondent.

References

Girls' schools in South Africa
High schools in South Africa
Schools in Johannesburg
Educational institutions established in 1951
1951 establishments in South Africa